Glenburnie is an eastern suburb of Mount Gambier.

Its boundaries were created in 1999 for the "long established name" which derives from an early homestead in the area.  Its boundaries align in part in the north with the Glenelg Highway, in part to the south with both the Princes Highway and the Mount Gambier-Heywood railway line which closed to freight 11 April 1995 and used for Limestone Coast Railway tourist services to the border until 20 March 1999, and with the state border with Victoria to the east.

The Racecourse known as the Allan Scott Glenburnie Racecourse and the Borderline Speedway are located in Glenburnie. The Mount Gambier Greyhound Racing Club held greyhound racing meetings at the racecourse from 21 July 1979 until November 1996. The Club moved a short distance to the west to a purpose-built complex called the Tara Raceway at 161 Lake Terrace East.

The 2016 Australian census which was conducted in August 2016 reports that Glenburnie had a population of 376 people.

Glenburnie is located within the federal Division of Barker, the state electoral district of Mount Gambier and the local government areas of the District Council of Grant and the City of Mount Gambier. It also part of Mount Gambier’s urban sprawl.

References

Limestone Coast
Towns in South Australia